Captain is a rank in the Canadian military.

In the Canadian Army, the rank insignia of an army captain is three pips.
In the Royal Canadian Air Force, the rank insignia of an air force captain is two wide bars.
In the Royal Canadian Navy, the rank of Captain (N) actually corresponds to that of Colonel. When the naval rank captain is written or typed, it is followed by the letter (N) to indicate that it is a naval rank to distinguish it from army and air force captains. The equivalent rank in the Royal Canadian Navy is Lieutenant (N). Its insignia is two  stripes with the executive curl on the top stripe.

Prior to the unification of the Canadian Forces in 1968, the Royal Canadian Air Force used the rank of flight lieutenant.

See also
 Captain (armed forces)

References

Military ranks of Canada